"I Am an Island" is a song by Australian rock musician Richard Clapton. The song was released in February 1982 as the lead single from Clapton's seventh studio album, The Great Escape. The song peaked at number 20 on the Australian Kent Music Report; becoming Clapton's second top twenty single. It features Ian Moss on lead guitar, with Jimmy Barnes on backing vocals and Jon Farriss from INXS on drums.

Track listing 
Side one
 "I Am an Island" 
Side two
 "Walk On Water"

Charts

References 

1982 songs
1982 singles
Richard Clapton songs
Songs written by Richard Clapton
Song recordings produced by Mark Opitz